Hou Yu-ih (born 7 June 1957), also romanized Hou You-yi, is a Taiwanese politician. He has been the incumbent mayor of New Taipei since 25 December 2018. Previously, he has served as Director-General of the National Police Agency from 2006 to 2008 and as acting mayor of New Taipei City from October 2015 to January 2016.

Law enforcement career
Upon his graduation from the Central Police University, Hou was sent to the Taipei City Police Department. In 1992, he became an inspector at the Criminal Investigation Bureau (CIB), a division of the National Police Agency (NPA). Five years later, he led the rescue of the Alexander family. In 1998 Hou was named second in command of the CIB. He was given the concurrent post of Taoyuan County police chief in 2001 and promoted within the NPA in 2003, becoming the leader of the CIB. The next year, Hou was tasked with investigating the 3-19 shooting incident, an assassination attempt on President Chen Shui-bian, a longtime friend. He was named the director-general of the NPA in 2006, becoming the youngest leader of the police force at the time of his appointment. During his tenure, the NPA was criticized for its inadequate response to the 2006 protests led by Shih Ming-teh. Multiple Kuomintang politicians also wanted Hou to reopen the investigation on the 3-19 shooting incident. Arms dealer Tang Shou-yi, who had fled to Mainland China by August 2006, had recanted his confession, stating that it was coerced and therefore untrue.

Political career
Hou originally joined the Kuomintang in 1975, but allowed his membership to lapse during his law enforcement career. Hou was recruited to join the Democratic Progressive Party in 2002. Eric Chu asked Hou to serve as deputy mayor of New Taipei in 2010, and Hou rejoined the Kuomintang in 2013. Hou served as deputy mayor alongside Lee Shu-chuan and Hsu Chih-chien who left office on 25 February 2014 and 30 June 2014, respectively. Later, Chen Shen-hsien was appointed to the deputy mayorship. Hou was promoted from his previous position as deputy mayor on 20 October 2015, as Chu prepared for the 2016 presidential election. Chu lost the election to Tsai Ing-wen, and resumed mayoral duties on 18 January 2016.

Hou resigned from the deputy mayorship on 28 February 2018, stating that he would contest the Kuomintang mayoral primary. On 6 April 2018, the KMT announced that Hou had won the primary.

2018 New Taipei mayoral election

2022 New Taipei mayoral election
On August 17, 2022, Hou confirmed that he would run for a second term as mayor of New Taipei.

Personal life
He and his wife Jen Mei-ling raised three daughters, Hou Yu-fan, Hou Ni-chia, and Hou Yu-chia.

References

External links

|-

|-

1957 births
Living people
Mayors of New Taipei
Politicians of the Republic of China on Taiwan from Chiayi County
Academic staff of the Central Police University
Central Police University alumni
Taiwanese police officers
Taiwanese people of Hoklo descent
Deputy mayors of New Taipei
Kuomintang politicians in Taiwan
21st-century Taiwanese politicians
Presidents of universities and colleges in Taiwan